HI or Hi may refer to:

Arts and entertainment
 Hello Internet, a podcast hosted by CGP Grey and Brady Haran
 Hi (magazine), teen-lifestyle publication
 "Hi" (Ofra Haza song), a song by Ofra Haza, Israel's entry in the 1983 Eurovision Song Contest
 Hi, a character in the comic strip Hi and Lois
 Hi Records, in music, a Memphis soul and rockabilly label
 Hi (album), a 2021 album by Scottish band Texas
 "Hi" (Texas song), the title track
 Hi (EP), a 2006 EP by Psapp
 Hi~, a 2015 repackage of South Korean girl group Lovelyz' 2014 album Girls' Invasion
 "Hi", a song from the Xiu Xiu album Always

Language
 Hi (cuneiform), a cuneiform sign
 Hi (kana), a Japanese written character
 Hindi, an Indo-Aryan language (ISO 639-1 language code HI)
 Hi, a greeting in the English language similar to hello

Organizations and events
 Harlem International Film Festival, an annual five-day film festival
 Hostelling International, a federation of youth hostel associations
 Houston Industries Incorporated, former name of GenOn Energy
 University of Iceland, abbreviated "HÍ", from

Places
 Hi River, also known as the Ili River, in northwestern China
 Hainan, a province of China (Guobiao abbreviation HI)
 Hawaii, United States of America
 Hotel Indonesia, a hotel in Jakarta, Indonesia

Science and technology
 Hydrogen iodide, in chemistry, a diatomic molecule
 Health informatics, a discipline at the intersection of information science, computer science, and health care
 Historical institutionalism, in sociology, a social science method
 Hormonal imprinting, a biological phenomenon
Hemagglutination inhibition, method for quantifying the relative concentration of viruses, bacteria, or antibodies

Other uses 
 HI, a code for subtitles for the hearing impaired
 Hi Brigham (1892–1987), American football player
 Humorous Interpretation, an event in high school forensics competitions

See also 
 H I region, in astronomy, an interstellar cloud composed of neutral atomic hydrogen
 H&I (disambiguation)
 High (disambiguation)
 HY (disambiguation)
 Hydrogen-1, in physics, an isotope of hydrogen with one proton and zero neutrons (also known as protium)